The Garda Dog Support Unit is a unit of the Garda Síochána, the police force of Ireland.

It is part of the Support Unit which provides specialist support to Gardaí nationwide. The Operational Support Unit consists of:
Water Support Unit
Dog Support Unit
Mounted Support Unit
Air Support Unit
Formed in 1960, its main duties involve assisting in public order situations and searches.

There are 19 dogs in the unit, which is based at Kilmainham Garda Station, but there are also dog handlers in Cork and Limerick.

External links
Official site

Dog Unit
Police dogs
1960 establishments in Ireland
Animals in Ireland
People working with dogs